Psammobotys is a genus of moths of the family Crambidae.

Species
Psammobotys alpinalis Munroe, 1972
Psammobotys fordi Munroe, 1961

References

Natural History Museum Lepidoptera genus database

Odontiini
Crambidae genera
Taxa named by Eugene G. Munroe